Rapunzel is a book by Paul O. Zelinsky retelling the Grimm brothers' "Rapunzel" story. Released by Dutton Press, it was the recipient of the Caldecott Medal for illustration in 1998.

The story is a retelling of the original 1812 version, which leaves in details not present in later versions, such as Rapunzel giving birth to twins by the prince.

In 1998 a film version made by Weston Woods Studios was released, narrated by Maureen Anderman.

References

1997 children's books
American picture books
Caldecott Medal–winning works
Books illustrated by Paul O. Zelinsky
Picture books based on fairy tales
Witchcraft in written fiction 
Dutton Children's Books books
Works based on Rapunzel